The Mayor of Horowhenua officiates over the Horowhenua District of New Zealand's North Island.

Bernie Wanden has been mayor since 2019. Before being elected as mayor, he had served as a Horowhenua councillor.

List of mayors
Since its inception in 1989, Horowhenua District has had five mayors:

References

Horowhenua
Mayors of places in Manawatū-Whanganui
Horowhenua District